The  Cleveland Monsters are a professional ice hockey team in the American Hockey League (AHL). The team began play in 2007 as the Lake Erie Monsters and since 2015 has served as the top affiliate of the Columbus Blue Jackets of the National Hockey League (NHL). The Monsters play home games at Rocket Mortgage FieldHouse in downtown Cleveland and have one Calder Cup championship, after winning their first title in 2016.

Franchise history

Early years
The Monsters began in 2006 when the dormant Utah Grizzlies AHL franchise was purchased on May 16, 2006, by a Cleveland ownership group led by Dan Gilbert, owner of the Cleveland Cavaliers and Quicken Loans. A new AHL team was awarded to Cleveland following the departure of the Cleveland Barons to Worcester, Massachusetts, after the 2005–06 season. With Quicken Loans Arena established as the team's home venue, the Colorado Avalanche was announced on December 17, 2006, as the franchise's first NHL parent club with a five-year agreement.

The franchise was officially announced on January 25, 2007, as the Lake Erie Monsters, referring to Bessie, a creature of local folklore. The name was chosen from researching focus groups around the Cleveland area and the logo incorporated the geographical connection in the region with Lake Erie.

Former NHL player Joe Sacco was named as the Lake Erie Monsters first head coach and Dave Oliver was named general manager. The Monsters opened their inaugural 2007–08 campaign with a loss at home against the Grand Rapids Griffins on October 9, 2007. The team ended the season 26–41.

At the end of the 2010–11 season, the Monsters qualified for the Calder Cup playoffs for the first time in team history. After gaining a 3–1 series lead over the Manitoba Moose in the opening round, the Monsters proceeded to lose the next three consecutive games, losing the series 4–3.

Blue Jackets era

On April 17, 2015, the Monsters announced the signing of a multi-year agreement to become the AHL affiliate for the Columbus Blue Jackets, which took effect in the 2015–16 season. The multi-season affiliation was extended in 2019.

The Monsters finished the 2015–16 season by setting a franchise record in points (97) and qualified for the playoffs for the second time in team history. On April 23, 2016, the Monsters defeated their first round opponent, the Rockford IceHogs, 5–3, ending a three-game sweep of their opponent in a best-of-five series. The Monsters advanced to the Western Conference Semifinals to play the Grand Rapids Griffins in a best-of-seven series, defeating them 4–2. They then swept the defending Calder Cup Champion Ontario Reign in the Western Conference Finals to reach their first Calder Cup Final in franchise history. On June 11, 2016, the Monsters won the franchise's first Calder Cup in a four-game sweep of the Hershey Bears, with Oliver Bjorkstrand scoring the Cup-winning goal in overtime.

This marked Cleveland's first AHL title since the Barons won their last Calder Cup in 1964, and 10th overall for a Cleveland-based AHL team. The Monsters won Game 4 before a sellout crowd of 19,665 people at Quicken Loans Arena — the second largest crowd for a professional hockey game in Ohio behind the 19,941 in a Cleveland Lumberjacks game against the Minnesota Moose in February 1996, and the second largest in Calder Cup playoff history behind the 20,103 Philadelphia Phantoms game four victory in the 2005 Calder Cup Finals over the Chicago Wolves.

On August 9, 2016, the Lake Erie Monsters changed their name to the Cleveland Monsters. The team's Calder Cup winning head coach, Jared Bednar, was then hired by the Colorado Avalanche on August 25. Under their new name and coach John Madden, the Monsters failed to qualify for the playoffs in the 2016–17 season. In the 2017–18 season, the Monsters earned last place in the Western Conference and failed to make the playoffs. The team returned to the playoffs following the 2018–19 season as the fourth seed in the North Division where they upset the division champion Syracuse Crunch before being swept by the Toronto Marlies in the division finals. Head coach John Madden then left the team and was replaced by Mike Eaves.

The Monsters 2019–20 season was curtailed by the onset of the COVID-19 pandemic. The team ended the season in last place in their division with a record of 24–31. Owing to the ongoing effects of the pandemic, the 2020–21 season was delayed and shortened with no playoffs held in their division. They ended the season in second place within their division.

Cleveland hockey history
The following teams have previously played in Cleveland. The Monsters recognize and honor past Cleveland teams with commemorative banners at Rocket Mortgage FieldHouse:
Cleveland Indians/Falcons/Barons (1929–1936 IHL;  1936–1973 AHL) — nine-time Calder Cup champions
Cleveland Crusaders (1972–1976) WHA
Cleveland Barons (1976–1978) NHL
Cleveland Lumberjacks (1992–2001) IHL
Cleveland Barons (2001–2006) AHL

Season-by-season results
Note: gold shading indicates season team won Calder Cup

Players

Current roster
Updated March 18, 2023.

|}

Team captains

 Mark Rycroft, 2007–08
 Wyatt Smith, 2008
 Brian Willsie, 2008–10
 David Liffiton, 2010–12
 Bryan Lerg, 2012–14
 Brian Sutherby, 2013
 Bruno Gervais, 2014–15
 Ryan Craig, 2015–17
 Nathan Gerbe, 2018–19
 Zac Dalpe, 2019–21
 Dillon Simpson, 2021–present

Retired numbers

No Monsters player has had his number retired. However, the team has retired the numbers of players who have played on past Cleveland franchises to honor the city's hockey history.

Team records

Single season
Goals: 33, Zac Dalpe (2018–19)
Assists: 50, T.J. Hensick (2009–10)
Points: 70 T.J. Hensick (2009–10), Ben Walter (2010–11)
Penalty minutes: 215, Daniel Maggio (2014–15)
Wins: 27, Anton Forsberg (2016–17)
GAA: 2.11, Cedrick Desjardins (2011–12)
SV%: .932, Cedrick Desjardins (2011–12)
Shutouts: 8, Tyler Weiman (2008–09)

Goaltending records need a minimum 25 games played by the goaltender

Playoffs

Goals: 10, Oliver Bjorkstrand (2016)
Assists: 10, Ryan Craig (2016)
Points: 16 (tie), Oliver Bjorkstrand and Lukas Sedlak (2016)
Penalty minutes: 26, Kerby Rychel (2016)
Wins: 9, Anton Forsberg (2016)
GAA: 1.34, Anton Forsberg (2016)
SV%: .949, Anton Forsberg (2016)
Shutouts: 2, Anton Forsberg (2016)

Career
Career goals: Andrew Agozzino, 67
Career assists: Andrew Agozzino, 98
Career points: Andrew Agozzino, 165
Career penalty minutes: Brett Gallant, 629
Career goaltending wins: Calvin Pickard, 60
Career shutouts: Tyler Weiman, 13
Career games: Justin Scott, 336

Firsts and team records
First game: October 6, 2007, vs. Grand Rapids Griffins
First win: October 20, 2007, 3–2 vs. Syracuse Crunch
First goal: Matt Hussey (October 6, 2007 vs. Grand Rapids Griffins)
First shutout: Jason Bacashihua (November 15, 2007, vs. Quad City Flames)
First hat trick: Chris Stewart (November 17, 2007, vs. Toronto Marlies)
Most goals in a game: 4 by Patrick Rissmiller (December 3, 2010, vs. Chicago Wolves)
Most wins in a season: 44 (2010–11)
Most home wins in a season: 25 (2015–16)
Most points in a season: 97 (2015–16)
Most games won in a row: 8 (2010–11)
First playoff game: April 16, 2011. (vs. Manitoba Moose)
First playoff goal: April 16, 2011 (by Matthew Ford)
First playoff win: April 16, 2011 (Monsters 6, Manitoba Moose 4)
First playoff series win: April 23, 2016 (Monsters won series 3–0 vs. Rockford IceHogs)
First Western Conference championship: May 26, 2016 (Monsters won series 4–0 vs. Ontario Reign)
First Calder Cup championship: June 11, 2016 (Monsters won series 4–0 vs. Hershey Bears)

Media
Radio

WARF AM 1350 serves as the radio outlet for the team. Play-by-play announcer Tony Brown calls games on-site.

TV

Select Monsters games will be televised, with Bally Sports Great Lakes serving as the outlet.  The broadcast team consists of play-by-play broadcaster Tony Brown, former Monsters goaltender and current Columbus Blue Jackets goaltender development coach Brad Thiessen as booth analyst, former Cleveland Lumberjacks player Jock Callander as rinkside analyst, and WHBC afternoon host Kenny Roda as host/locker room reporter.  All televised games are also simulcast on the radio.

Mascot and entertainment
The Monsters' official mascot is a seagull character named "Sullivan C. Goal" (aka "Sully"). Also featured are the "Monsters Hockey Girls" cheerleaders.

References

External links

Cleveland Monsters (official website)

 
Colorado Avalanche minor league affiliates
Columbus Blue Jackets minor league affiliates
Ice hockey clubs established in 2007
Ice hockey teams in Ohio
Monsters
2007 establishments in Ohio
Rock Ventures